Elections in Germany include elections to the Bundestag (Germany's federal parliament), the Landtags of the various states, and local elections.

Several articles in several parts of the Basic Law for the Federal Republic of Germany govern elections and establish constitutional requirements such as the secret ballot, and requirement that all elections be conducted in a free and fair manner. The Basic Law also requires that the federal legislature enact detailed federal laws to govern elections; electoral law(s). One such article is Article 38, regarding the election of deputies in the federal Bundestag. Article 38.2 of the Basic Law establishes universal suffrage: "Any person who has attained the age of eighteen shall be entitled to vote; any person who has attained the age of majority may be elected."

German federal elections are for all members of the Bundestag, which in turn determines who is the chancellor of Germany. The most recent federal election was held in 2021.

German elections from 1871 to 1945

After the unification of Germany under Emperor Wilhelm I in 1871, elections were held to the German Reichstag or Imperial Assembly, which supplanted its namesake, the Reichstag of the North German Confederation. The Reichstag could be dissolved by the emperor or, after the abdication of Wilhelm II in 1918, the president of Germany. With the Weimar Republic's Constitution of 1919, the voting system changed from single-member constituencies to proportional representation. The election age was reduced from 25 to 20 years of age. Women's suffrage had already been established by a new electoral law in 1918 following the November Revolution of that year.

Following the Nazi seizure of power in January 1933, another national election was held on 5 March. This was the last competitive election before World War II, although it was neither free nor fair. On 27 February, just prior to the election, the Reichstag Fire Decree suspended freedom of the press and most civil liberties. While the Nazi Party performed better than it had in the elections of November 1932, it still won only 33% of the vote. By placing their rivals in jail and intimidating others not to take their seats, the Nazis went from a plurality to the majority. Just two weeks after the election, the Enabling Act of 1933 effectively gave Hitler dictatorial power. Three more elections were held in Nazi Germany before the war. They all took the form of a one-question referendum, asking voters to approve a predetermined list of candidates composed exclusively of Nazis and nominally independent "guests" of the party.

Imperial elections
 1848
 1871
 1874
 1877
 1878
 1881
 1884
 1887
 1890
 1893
 1898
 1903
 1907
 1912

Weimar Republic federal elections 
 1919
 1920
 May 1924
 December 1924
 1928
 1930
 July 1932
 November 1932

Elections in Nazi Germany
 March 1933, federal
 November 1933, federal
 1936, parliamentary
 1938, parliamentary

German elections since 1949

Federal Republic of Germany

Election system

Federal elections are conducted approximately every four years, resulting from the constitutional requirement for elections to be held 46 to 48 months after the assembly of the Bundestag. Elections can be held earlier in exceptional constitutional circumstances: for example, were the Chancellor to lose a vote of confidence in the Bundestag, then, during a grace period before the Bundestag can vote in a replacement Chancellor, the Chancellor could request the Federal President to dissolve the Bundestag and hold elections. Should the Bundestag be dismissed before the four-year period has ended, elections must be held within 100 days. The exact date of the election is chosen by the President and must be a Sunday or public holiday.

German nationals over the age of 18 who have resided in Germany for at least three months are eligible to vote. Eligibility for candidacy is essentially the same.

The federal legislature in Germany has a one chamber parliament—the Bundestag (Federal Diet); the Bundesrat (Federal Council) represents the regions and is not considered a chamber as its members are not elected. The Bundestag is elected using a mixed member proportional system. The Bundestag has 598 nominal members, elected for a four-year term. Half, 299 members, are elected in single-member constituencies by first-past-the-post voting, while a further 299 members are allocated from party lists to achieve a proportional distribution in the legislature, conducted according to a form of proportional representation called the Mixed member proportional representation system (MMP). Voters vote once for a constituency representative, and a second time for a party, and the lists are used to make the party balances match the distribution of second votes. Overhang seats may add to the nominal number of 598 members: for example, in the 2009 federal election there were 24 overhang seats, giving a total of 622 seats. This is caused by larger parties winning additional single-member constituencies above the totals determined by their proportional party vote.

Germany has a multi-party system with two strong political parties and some other third parties also represented in the Bundestag. Since 1990, five parties (counting the CDU and CSU as one) have been represented in the Bundestag.

In 2008, some modifications to the electoral system were required under an order of the Federal Constitutional Court. The court had found that a provision in the Federal Election Law made it possible for a party to experience a negative vote weight, thus losing seats due to more votes, and found that this violated the constitutional guarantee of the electoral system being equal and direct.

The court allowed three years to amend the law. Accordingly, the 2009 federal election was allowed to proceed under the previous system. The changes were due by 30 June 2011, but appropriate legislation was not completed by that deadline. A new electoral law was enacted in late 2011, but declared unconstitutional once again by the Federal Constitutional Court upon lawsuits from the opposition parties and a group of some 4,000 private citizens.

Finally, four of the five factions in the Bundestag agreed on an electoral reform whereby the number of seats in the Bundestag will be increased as much as necessary to ensure that any overhang seats are compensated through apportioned leveling seats, to ensure full proportionality according to the political party's share of party votes at the national level. The Bundestag approved and enacted the new electoral reform in February 2013.

List of federal election results

 1st 1949 West German federal election
 2nd 1953 West German federal election
 3rd 1957 West German federal election
 4th 1961 West German federal election
 5th 1965 West German federal election
 6th 1969 West German federal election
 7th 1972 West German federal election
 8th 1976 West German federal election
 9th 1980 West German federal election
 10th 1983 West German federal election
 11th 1987 West German federal election
 12th 1990 German federal election (1st of the re-united Germany)
 13th 1994 German federal election
 14th 1998 German federal election
 15th 2002 German federal election
 16th 2005 German federal election
 17th 2009 German federal election
 18th 2013 German federal election
 19th 2017 German federal election
 20th 2021 German federal election

State elections in the Federal Republic of Germany
State elections are conducted under various rules set by the Länder (states). In general they are conducted according to some form of party-list proportional representation, either the same as the federal system or some simplified version. The election period is generally four to five years, and the dates of elections vary from state to state.

Baden-Württemberg state election results
 2001 Baden-Württemberg state election
 2006 Baden-Württemberg state election
 2011 Baden-Württemberg state election
 2016 Baden-Württemberg state election
 2021 Baden-Württemberg state election
 2026 Baden-Württemberg state election

Bavaria state election results
 1986 Bavarian state election
 1990 Bavarian state election
 1994 Bavarian state election
 1998 Bavarian state election
 2003 Bavarian state election
 2008 Bavarian state election
 2013 Bavarian state election
 2018 Bavarian state election
 2023 Bavarian state election

Berlin state election results
 2001 Berlin state election
 2006 Berlin state election
 2011 Berlin state election
 2016 Berlin state election
 2021 Berlin state election
 2023 Berlin repeat state election

Brandenburg state election results
 1999 Brandenburg state election
 2004 Brandenburg state election
 2009 Brandenburg state election
 2014 Brandenburg state election
 2019 Brandenburg state election
 2024 Brandenburg state election

Bremen state election results
 2003 Bremen state election
 2007 Bremen state election
 2011 Bremen state election
 2015 Bremen state election
 2019 Bremen state election
 2023 Bremen state election

Hamburg state election results

2004 Hamburg state election
2008 Hamburg state election
2011 Hamburg state election
2015 Hamburg state election
2020 Hamburg state election
2025 Hamburg state election

Hessian state election results
 1999 Hessian state election
 2003 Hessian state election
 2008 Hessian state election
 2009 Hessian state election
 2013 Hessian state election
 2018 Hessian state election
 2023 Hessian state election

Lower Saxony state election results
 1998 Lower Saxony state election
 2003 Lower Saxony state election
 2008 Lower Saxony state election
 2013 Lower Saxony state election
 2017 Lower Saxony state election

Mecklenburg-Vorpommern state election results
 2002 Mecklenburg-Vorpommern state election
 2006 Mecklenburg-Vorpommern state election
 2011 Mecklenburg-Vorpommern state election
 2016 Mecklenburg-Vorpommern state election
 2021 Mecklenburg-Vorpommern state election
 2026 Mecklenburg-Vorpommern state election

North Rhine-Westphalia state election results
 2000 North Rhine-Westphalia state election
 2005 North Rhine-Westphalia state election
 2010 North Rhine-Westphalia state election
 2012 North Rhine-Westphalia state election
 2017 North Rhine-Westphalia state election
 2022 North Rhine-Westphalia state election

Rhineland-Palatinate state election results
 2001 Rhineland-Palatinate state election
 2006 Rhineland-Palatinate state election
 2011 Rhineland-Palatinate state election
 2016 Rhineland-Palatinate state election
 2021 Rhineland-Palatinate state election

Saarland state election results
 1999 Saarland state election
 2004 Saarland state election
 2009 Saarland state election
 2012 Saarland state election
 2017 Saarland state election
 2022 Saarland state election

Saxony state election results
 1999 Saxony state election
 2004 Saxony state election
 2009 Saxony state election
 2014 Saxony state election
 2019 Saxony state election
 2024 Saxony state election

Saxony-Anhalt state election results
 2002 Saxony-Anhalt state election
 2006 Saxony-Anhalt state election
 2011 Saxony-Anhalt state election
 2016 Saxony-Anhalt state election
 2021 Saxony-Anhalt state election
 2026 Saxony-Anhalt state election

Schleswig-Holstein state election results
 2000 Schleswig-Holstein state election
 2005 Schleswig-Holstein state election
 2009 Schleswig-Holstein state election
 2012 Schleswig-Holstein state election
 2017 Schleswig-Holstein state election
 2022 Schleswig-Holstein state election

Thuringia state election results
 2004 Thuringian state election
 2009 Thuringian state election
 2014 Thuringian state election
 2019 Thuringian state election
 2024 Thuringian state election

German Democratic Republic

In the German Democratic Republic, elections to the Volkskammer were effectively controlled by the Socialist Unity Party of Germany (SED) and state hierarchy, even though multiple pro forma parties existed. The 18 March 1990 election were the first free ones held in the GDR, producing a government whose major mandate was to negotiate an end to itself and its state.

Prior to the Fall of the Berlin Wall, East Germany did not have free elections. Polling places were under surveillance by the state security apparatuses and the ruling party, the SED, presented voters with a slate of proposed candidates. Voters could optionally enter a booth to strike any candidates the voter did not want; a voter who agreed with the SED's full list simply folded the unmarked ballot in half and placed it into the ballot box. Entering a voting booth was considered suspicious and was noted by the state security apparatuses, which could lead to consequences later for the voter. East German voters commonly referred to the act of voting as "folding". Election outcomes prior to 1990 commonly saw 99% of voters in favor of the suggested slate of candidates. On top of this, the government engaged in electoral fraud and commonly falsified both results and voter turnout percentages, even as late as the May 1989 municipal elections.

1949 East German Constitutional Assembly election
1950 East German general election
1954 East German general election
1958 East German general election
1963 East German general election
1967 East German general election
1971 East German general election
1976 East German general election
1981 East German general election
1986 East German general election
1990 East German general election

Local elections

Local elections in Germany include elections for most regional and local subdivisions, unless their representatives are appointed or elected by another assembly or office. Such local elections are conducted for representatives in districts, cities, towns, villages and various other administrative regional organizations. In cities and towns local elections usually include voting for a lord mayor or mayor. Smaller villages and settlements may elect a representative with limited administrative power. Local elections are also often combined with polls about important local matters and questions of general public interest (i.e. the construction of local roads or other infrastructure facilities). While such polls are not legally binding in most cases, their results have considerable influence on local political decisions.

After the Maastricht Treaty of 1992 to strengthen the European integration, Germany and other EU member states implemented legislative changes to grant foreigners of other EU countries the right to vote in local elections in their host country. Foreign EU citizens can vote in elections on district and municipal level in Germany, after the German states adapted their regulations between 1995 and 1998.

See also

 Electoral calendar
 Electoral system
 Electoral system of Germany

References

Further reading

External links
 Adam Carr's Election Archive
 Parties and elections
 Opinion poll tracker with data, graph and daily average
 Latest polling results for state and federal elections 
 The Federal Returning Officer. Official Site of the Federal Returning Officer.
 Collection of German Election Posters of Weimar Republic and Federal Republic
 NSD: European Election Database – Germany publishes regional level election data; allows for comparisons of election results, 1990–2009